The National Anthem of Somalia was the national anthem of Somalia between 1960 and 2000.

History
The Somali Republic was formed on 1 July 1960 following the union of the newly independent Trust Territory of Somalia (the former Italian Somaliland, now Somalia) and the State of Somaliland (the former British Somaliland, now Somaliland). At this time a wordless and untitled piece by Italian composer Giuseppe Blanc was adopted as the national anthem. This anthem remained in use during the Somali Democratic Republic period between 1969–1991. It was replaced with Soomaaliyeey toosoo by the Transitional national government of Somalia in 2000.

See also

 History of Somalia
 Flag of Somalia
 Soomaaliyeey toosoo, national anthem 2000–2012
 Qolobaa Calankeed, national anthem 2012–present

References

Historical national anthems
Somalian music
National symbols of Somalia
Somalia